Easy Riders, Raging Bulls: How the Sex-Drugs-and-Rock 'N Roll Generation Saved Hollywood is a book by Peter Biskind, published by Simon & Schuster in 1998. Easy Riders, Raging Bulls is about the 1960s and 1970s Hollywood, a period of American film known for the production of such films such as The Godfather, The Godfather Part II, The French Connection, Chinatown, Taxi Driver, Jaws, Star Wars, The Exorcist, and The Last Picture Show. The title is taken from films which bookend the era: Easy Rider (1969) and Raging Bull (1980). The book follows Hollywood on the brink of the Vietnam War, when a group of young Hollywood film directors known as the "movie brats" are making their names. It begins in the 1960s and ends in the 1980s.

The book was the basis of a 2003 documentary film of the same name directed by Kenneth Bowser and narrated by actor William H. Macy. It was screened out of competition at the 2003 Cannes Film Festival. Rotten Tomatoes gives the film a score of 100% based on reviews from 8 critics.

Profiles and interviews

Profiled in the book 

 Robert Altman
 Hal Ashby
 Luke Askew
 Gerald Ayres
 Warren Beatty
 Peter Bogdanovich
 Francis Ford Coppola
 Brian De Palma
 Robert Evans
 Peter Fonda
 William Friedkin
 Buck Henry
 Dennis Hopper
 Amy Irving
 George Lucas
 Marcia Lucas
 John Milius
 Jack Nicholson
 Polly Platt
 Bob Rafelson
 Bert Schneider
 Leonard Schrader
 Paul Schrader
 Martin Scorsese
 Cybill Shepherd
 Don Simpson
 Steven Spielberg
 Robert Towne

Interviewed in the film 

 Dede Allen
 Peter Bart
 Tony Bill
 Karen Black
 Peter Bogdanovich
 Ellen Burstyn
 Roger Corman
 Micky Dolenz
 Richard Dreyfuss
 Peter Fonda
 Carl Gottlieb
 Jerome Hellman
 Monte Hellman
 Dennis Hopper
 Willard Huyck
 Stanley Jaffe
 Henry Jaglom
 Gloria Katz
 Margot Kidder
 Laszlo Kovacs
 Kris Kristofferson
 Mardik Martin
 Mike Medavoy
 Sylvia Miles
 John Milius
 Charles Mulvehill
 David Newman
 Arthur Penn
 Michael Phillips
 David Picker
 Polly Platt
 Albert S. Ruddy
 Jennifer Salt
 Andrew Sarris
 Paul Schrader
 Cybill Shepherd
 Jonathan Taplin
 Joan Tewkesbury
 Fred Weintraub
 Gordon Willis
 Rudy Wurlitzer
 Vilmos Zsigmond

Controversy and criticism
Several of the film-makers profiled in the book have criticized Biskind. Robert Altman denounced both the book and Biskind's methods, saying "It was hate mail. We were all lured into talking to this guy because people thought he was a straight guy but he was filling a commission from the publisher for a hatchet job. He's the worst kind of human being I know." Francis Ford Coppola was similarly critical, alleging that Biskind interviewed only people with negative opinions of him.

Critic Roger Ebert noted that Steven Spielberg said of Easy Riders, Raging Bulls that: "Every single word in that book about me is either erroneous or a lie." Ebert himself notes that: "Biskind has a way of massaging his stories to suit his agenda." When asked about Biskind's portrayal of him as "a womanizer, a tyrant and a bully," William Friedkin said: "I've actually never read the book, but I've talked to some of my friends who are portrayed in it, and we all share the opinion that it is partial truth, partial myth and partial out-and-out lies by mostly rejected girlfriends and wives." Peter Bogdanovich was equally furious, saying: "I spent seven hours with that guy over a period of days, and he got it all wrong".

In an interview, Biskind stated he found the negative responses "very upsetting," also saying, "in the case of Coppola... he made three great movies, the two Godfathers and The Conversation.  His place in film history is secure. If I had made those films, I wouldn’t give a damn what anyone wrote about me." Biskind claims he and Coppola made amends on a cruise in 2000.

See also
A Decade Under the Influence - a 2003 documentary also about New Hollywood.

Further reading

References

External links
 
 The author of Easy Riders, Raging Bulls on egos, excess and "Indiewood" from BBC Four documentaries
 Easy Riders Review & Critics

1998 non-fiction books
Books about film
Non-fiction books adapted into films
Works about the history of Hollywood, Los Angeles
Simon & Schuster books
2003 documentary films
Documentary films about Hollywood, Los Angeles
2003 films
Films based on non-fiction books
American documentary films
2000s American films